The Bohemia River is a  tributary of the Elk River on the Delmarva Peninsula. It is located in Cecil County, Maryland, with its headwaters extending into New Castle County, Delaware.

The Bohemia River begins east of Hacks Point, Maryland, where its two major tributaries, Great Bohemia Creek and Little Bohemia Creek, come together, and ends at the Elk River in a wide mouth between Town Point and Ford Landing. Great Bohemia Creek and its tributary, Sandy Branch rise near Middletown, Delaware and Little Bohemia Creek rises near Warwick, Maryland. They flow through the level coastal plain, quickly reaching sea level.

There are several small creeks on the northern shore, including Pooles Creek and Manor Creek. On the southern shore small creeks include Morgan Creek and Scotchman Creek.

The Bohemia River was once known as the Oppoquimimi River, as it was known by Native Americans. The river was renamed by Augustine Herman after Bohemia, the country of his birth.

Location

References

 Bohemia River Association https://web.archive.org/web/20091211175701/http://www.bohemiariver.org/
 United States Geological Survey. 7.5 minute series topographic quadrangles
 
 General Highway Map of Cecil County, Maryland, 2005.  Prepared in collaboration between Maryland State and United States Federal governments.  http://www.sha.state.md.us/SHAServices/mapsBrochures/maps/OPPE/HISD_MAPS/83FTco07.PDF .

Tributaries of the Chesapeake Bay
Rivers of Maryland
Czech-American culture in Maryland
Rivers of Cecil County, Maryland